Teledyne Turbine Engines (TTE) is a turbine engine manufacturer located in Toledo, Ohio. A division of Teledyne Technologies Inc., TTE is the successor to the former Teledyne CAE.

History
In 1940, Continental Motors Corporation formed Continental Aviation and Engineering (CAE) to develop and produce aircraft engines of over 500 hp. It begins development of turbine engines during the 1940s, but none entered production.

From the 1950s-1970s, CAE built a licensed version of the Turbomeca Marboré as the Teledyne CAE J69.

In 1969, Teledyne Incorporated acquired Continental Motors Corporation, which became Teledyne Continental Motors (TCM). CAE was renamed Teledyne CAE, headquartered in Toledo, Ohio.

After the 1999 sale of Teledyne Ryan Aeronautical to Northrop Grumman, and the subsequent spin-off of Teledyne Technologies Inc. by Allegheny Teledyne in November that year, Teledyne CAE was renamed Teledyne Turbine Engines. In the next decade, it was placed under Teledyne Continental Motors as its TCM Turbine Engines division.

Products

Turbojet
 J69
 J100
 J402
 J700
 Palas

Turboprop/turboshafts
 T51
 T67
 T72

Ramjets
 RJ35
 RJ45
 RJ49

References

External links

 Teledyne Turbine Engines official site

Companies based in Toledo, Ohio
Defunct aircraft engine manufacturers of the United States
Teledyne Technologies
American companies established in 1940
1940 establishments in Ohio
Manufacturing companies established in 1940